I Gede Ardhika (15 February 1945 – 20 February 2021) was an Indonesian politician, who served as the Minister for Culture and Tourism in Indonesia from 2000 to 2004. He died four days after his 76th birthday.

References

External links
 I Gede Ardika  - Tokoh Indonesia

1945 births
2021 deaths
Indonesian Hindus
Government ministers of Indonesia
Balinese people
Politicians from West Java